Longworth Hall is a registered historic building in Cincinnati, Ohio, listed in the National Register on December 29, 1986. Longworth Hall is 5 stories, while the Baltimore Freight Terminal is 8 stories.

History 
During construction,  of pilings were driven to support the concrete foundations.  The piers between the first floor doors are of Bedford limestone.  4.25 million bricks were used in the walls.  Floor loads are carried on steel girders and these in turn are carried on steel columns.  Floors, joists, roof beams, etc., are frame requiring  of lumber.

The lower floor was designed as the inbound freight house with the upper four floors for storage. The facility trackage could accommodate 125 cars. Other facilities included a boiler house, a 6 stall roundhouse, a coal tipple and a U.S. Customs Bonded Warehouse, for the care of imported goods.

Tenants 
The Cincinnati Children's Museum occupied all four stories at the western end of Longworth Hall until floodwaters inundated the building during the flood of 1997, forcing the museum to relocate to the Cincinnati Museum Center at Union Terminal the following year. WOXY.com's studios were located in Longworth Hall from September 2004 until the Internet radio station moved to Austin, Texas, in 2009.

Barefoot Proximity is currently located in Longworth Hall.

Fisher Design is currently located in Longworth Hall.

Dotloop is currently headquartered in Longworth Hall.

 Industrial Reliability and Repair  is currently headquartered in Longworth Hall

Notes

External links 
 
 Documentation from the University of Cincinnati

National Register of Historic Places in Cincinnati
Office buildings in Cincinnati
Baltimore and Ohio Railroad
Rail transportation in Cincinnati
Railway freight houses on the National Register of Historic Places
Railway buildings and structures on the National Register of Historic Places in Ohio
Transportation buildings and structures in Cincinnati